Siegfried Franz (1913–1998) was a German composer of film and television scores.

Selected filmography
 Canaris (1954)
 Three Birch Trees on the Heath (1956)
 The Doctor of Stalingrad (1958)
 Escape from Sahara (1958)
 Night Nurse Ingeborg (1958)
 Doctor Crippen Lives (1958)
 The Girl from the Marsh Croft (1958)
 Dorothea Angermann (1959)
 Carnival Confession (1960)
 The Liar (1961)
 Beloved Impostor (1961)
 The Happy Years of the Thorwalds (1962)
 Angels of the Street (1969)
 Heidi (1978)

References

Bibliography 
 Greco, Joseph. The File on Robert Siodmak in Hollywood, 1941-1951. Universal-Publishers, 1999.

External links 
 

1913 births
1998 deaths
German composers
Musicians from Mannheim